Clermont County Airport  is a public use airport located two nautical miles (4 km) west of the central business district of Batavia, a village in Clermont County, Ohio, United States. It is owned by the Clermont County Commissioners.

It is also known as Sporty's Airport. The fixed-base operator is Eastern Cincinnati Aviation. The Tri-State Warbird Museum is located on the west side of the airport. The 279th Composite Squadron of the Civil Air Patrol is headquartered at the airport as well.

History
Dedicated on 13 October 1968, the airport was managed by the husband and wife team of Randolph and Rosalie Burchett from the early 1970s through 1986. In 1971, Sporty's Pilot Shop moved from its previous location to the airport. The Clermont General and Technical College opened in 1972 on land one-half mile from the airport. Plans for a  hangar were announced that same year and by June a new taxiway had been constructed. Sporty's became the new fixed base operator in 1987.

In 1990, Sporty's built a new facility at the airport. Consideration was given to extending the airport runway in 1994. In 1995, the radio station WNWC began broadcasting from the airport. By 2010, a number of "hangar homes" had been constructed at the airport.

In early 2011 the owner of the airport's fixed base operator proposed extending the airport's runway. In mid-2013 discussions were ongoing regarding the possibility of extending the runway. By early 2014 the county was attempting to buy the land necessary for the runway extension. The Clermont County Transportation Improvement District board voted to approve the runway extension on 15 January 2016. In early 2017 the runway extension plan needed approval from the Federal Aviation Administration. However, by February 2018 the runway extension had been cancelled.

Facilities and aircraft
It has one runway designated 4/22 with a 3,568 x 75 ft (1,088 x 23 m) asphalt surface.

The airport is served by four instrument approaches, including an RNAV (GPS) approach to both runway 4 and 22. 

For the 12-month period ending December 19, 2007, the airport had 30,650 aircraft operations, an average of 83 per day: 98% general aviation, 2% air taxi and <1% military. At that time there were 120 aircraft based at this airport:
88% single-engine, 7% multi-engine, 4% helicopter, 1% jet and 1% glider.

Local television station WCPO operates a doppler weather radar at the airport. An airport viewing area is located at the southwest edge of the airport. The aircraft upholstery shop Air Mod is based at the airport.

Accidents and incidents
 On 17 August 1973, two airplanes collided in mid-air while attempting to land at the airport. Both landed safely.
 On 20 June 1978, a Mooney Cadet crashed while attempting to land at the airport, injuring the pilot and a passenger.
 On 15 August 1998, a Beechcraft Bonanza crashed near the airport after an aborted approach, killing the pilot.
 On 28 October 2001, a Grumman American AA-1 crashed shortly after taking off from the airport.
 On 30 June 2003, a Raytheon B36TC Bonanza overran the runway following an emergency landing at the airport.
 On 6 July 2004, a Grumman American AA-1 crashed shortly after taking off from the airport, injuring the pilot and a passenger.
 On 11 April 2005, a Cessna 152 crashed near Mount Orab, Ohio after taking off from the airport, killing an instructor and student.
 On 8 December 2011, a Curtiss P-40M Kittyhawk overran the runway on landing following an engine failure.
 On 13 December 2011, an airplane overran the runway on takeoff due to a blown tire.
 On 12 April 2014, an Avid Flyer crashed on a golf course in Withamsville, Ohio after taking off from the airport.
 On 5 July 2015, an Aviat Husky crashed in Pierce Township after taking off from the airport.
 On 6 May 2016, a Stinson 108 nosed over on landing at the airport.
 On 5 November 2017, a Piper PA-28 crashed while landing at the airport, injuring the pilot.
 On 8 May 2018, a Cessna 172 crashed while taking off from the airport.
 On 24 May 2018, a Luscombe 8 was damaged after being hand propped. It was stopped after being rammed by an SUV.

References

External links
Eastern Cincinnati Aviation

Airports in Ohio
Buildings and structures in Clermont County, Ohio
County government agencies in Ohio
Transportation in Clermont County, Ohio